(Christopher Columbus) is an opera in two parts by the French composer Darius Milhaud. The poet Paul Claudel wrote the libretto based on his own play about the life of Christopher Columbus, Le Livre de Christophe Colomb. The opera was first performed at the Staatsoper, Berlin, on 5 May 1930 in a German translation by Rudolph Stephan Hoffmann. Milhaud thoroughly revised the work and produced a second version around 1955. The opera is on a large scale and requires many resources for its staging. As in many of his other works, Milhaud employs polytonality in parts of the score.

Roles

Synopsis
The opera tells the life of Christopher Columbus in a series of episodes which avoid chronological order and are sometimes allegorical.

Recording
Janine Micheau (Reine Isabelle), Claudine Collart (Duchesse Medina Sidonia), Robert Massard (Christophe Colomb), Xavier Depraz (Christophe Colomb II, Messenger, etc.), Jean Giraudeau (Majordome, Cuisinier, Valet, Sultan), Lucien Lovano (Roi d'Espagne, Commandant, Aubergiste etc.), Orchestre Radio Lyrique, Chœurs de la RTF, conducted by Manuel Rosenthal. Disques Montaigne CE 8750 (from the INA), released 1987; recorded at the Théâtre des Champs-Élysées on 31 May 1956.

(A 1954 recording "conducted by Pierre Boulez" is of the Claudel play, with different incidental music by Milhaud, and a cast including Jean-Pierre Granval, Jean Desailly, Jean-Louis Barrault, Pierre Bertin, and Madeleine Renaud).

References

Further reading
The Viking Opera Guide ed. Amanda Holden (Viking, 1993)
Del Teatro (in Italian)

French-language operas
Operas by Darius Milhaud
1930 operas
Operas
Opera world premieres at the Berlin State Opera
Cultural depictions of Christopher Columbus
Compositions with a narrator
Operas based on plays